Bjørn Rime (born 18 January 1945) is a Norwegian former football player and coach. He played 130 matches in the Norwegian Premier League, nine seasons with Rosenborg BK, Trondheim and one with SK Gjøvik-Lyn. Being a defender he scored only four goals in these matches. He was capped once for Norway national football team. He was head coach for Rosenborg BK in the 1977 season.

Biography
Bjørn Rime played for SK Gjøvik-Lyn when the club was in the Norwegian top division in the 1963 season. He came to in Rosenborg in 1968 and quickly became regular as defender.

Rime was capped once for Norway national football team in a match versus Iceland in 1971.

Rime was head coach of Rosenborg BK in the 1977 season. Rime now lives in Trondheim, managing a steel company.

Honours
Rosenborg BK
Norwegian Premier League champion: 1969,  1971,
Norwegian Premier League runner up:  1970, 1973
Norwegian Cup win: 1971
Norwegian Cup runner up: 1972, 1973

External links

References

Norway international footballers
Norwegian football managers
Norwegian footballers
Footballers from Trondheim
Rosenborg BK managers
Rosenborg BK players
Eliteserien players
1945 births
Living people
SK Gjøvik-Lyn players
Association football defenders